The Corrupting Sea: A Study of Mediterranean History is a book written by Peregrine Horden and Nicholas Purcell and published in 2000. The book is regarded as revolutionizing Mediterranean studies, introducing important concepts such as micro-ecologies and 'history of,' rather than 'history in'

References

2000 non-fiction books
History books
History of the Mediterranean